Fusivoluta barnardi is a species of sea snail, a marine gastropod mollusc in the family Volutidae, the volutes.

Description

Distribution

References

External links

Volutidae
Gastropods described in 1969